The ICW United States Tag Team Championship was the top tag team championship in International Championship Wrestling. Because the championship is a professional wrestling championship, it is not won or lost competitively but instead by the decision of the bookers of a wrestling promotion. The championship is awarded after the chosen team "wins" a match to maintain the illusion that professional wrestling is a competitive sport.

Title history

Footnotes

References

International Championship Wrestling championships
Tag team wrestling championships
United States professional wrestling championships